Kafr Zurqan is a village in the Tala Markaz in Monufia Governorate in Egypt. It is located next to the village of Mit Abu El Kom, where former President Anwar Sadat was born. It is affiliated to the local unit in Mit Abu al-Kom.

Population 
The population of Kafr Zarqan was 1,628, according to the 2006 census.

Facilities 
The village primary school is named Anwar Sadat Primary School. An Iraqi mosque is in the village. Sama Ahmad Nabil Salman Bakery is there  along with the Kafr Zarqan Youth Center.

Governance 
Fathi Salman served as a Member of the People's Assembly in the 1971-1976 legislative term  for the constituency of Tala.

See also 

 List of cities and towns in Egypt

References 

Populated places in Monufia Governorate